My Paper was a free, bilingual (English and Chinese) newspaper in Singapore published by the Singapore Press Holdings.

It is published from Mondays to Fridays, excluding public holidays; and an electronic copy of the print edition is published on the paper's website. The newspaper has a daily circulation of 300,000 copies, and is distributed in the morning at MRT stations, bus interchanges, office buildings and selected residential areas in Singapore.

my Paper is a compact-sized, full-colour newspaper and features two "front" pages. It is divided equally into both English-language and Chinese-language sections with the pages of the English-language side of the paper reading from left to right (as would an English-language book); while the pages of the Chinese-language on the opposite side of the paper reads from right to left (as would a Chinese-language book). Instead of a mirror translation of articles, each piece of news or commentary in my Paper is presented in one language only.

History
my Paper was first published on 1 June 2006 and was the first free Chinese-language newspaper in Singapore. It started with a daily circulation of 100,000 copies and was initially published from Tuesdays to Saturdays. On 8 January 2008, my Paper was relaunched as the first full-fledged bilingual newspaper in Singapore.

On 17 October 2016, Singapore Press Holdings announced a cut 10% of staff, that My Paper and The New Paper (TNP) will merge to form a revamped TNP that will be distributed free from 1 December 2016.

On 30 November 2016, it has been confirmed that TNP will officially merge with MyPaper to form a free newspaper from 1 December 2016.

See also
 List of newspapers in Singapore

References

External links
 

2006 establishments in Singapore
2016 disestablishments in Singapore
Singapore Press Holdings
Defunct newspapers published in Singapore
English-language newspapers published in Asia
Chinese-language newspapers (Simplified Chinese)
Bilingual newspapers
Defunct free daily newspapers
Publications established in 2006
Publications disestablished in 2016